Dalian Road is an interchange station between Line 4 and Line 12 of the Shanghai Metro.

Station Layout

Places nearby
The National Anthem Park, in memorial of the March of the Volunteers, is located just beyond Exit 2.
The National Anthem Gallery (a top 10 museum in Shanghai) is located near the park (151 Jingzhou Road).
Shanghai China Modern National treasure Art Museum is located near the park (368, Changyang Road)

References

Railway stations in Shanghai
Shanghai Metro stations in Hongkou District
Shanghai Metro stations in Yangpu District
Line 4, Shanghai Metro
Line 12, Shanghai Metro
Railway stations in China opened in 2005